Holaspulus is a genus of mites in the family Parholaspididae. There are about 16 described species in Holaspulus.

Species
These 15 species belong to the genus Holaspulus:

 Holaspulus apoensis Ishikawa, 1993
 Holaspulus epistomatus Ishikawa, 1993
 Holaspulus formosanus Tseng, 1993
 Holaspulus ishigakiensis Ishikawa, 1994
 Holaspulus luzonicus Ishikawa, 1993
 Holaspulus orientalis Tseng, 1993
 Holaspulus palawanensis Ishikawa, 1993
 Holaspulus primitivus Ishikawa, 1993
 Holaspulus reticulatus Ishikawa, 1994
 Holaspulus sclerus Ishikawa, 1993
 Holaspulus serratus Ishikawa, 1979
 Holaspulus silvestris Ishikawa, 1993
 Holaspulus subtropicus Tseng, 1993
 Holaspulus tenuipes Berlese
 Holaspulus tweediei Evans

References

Parholaspididae
Articles created by Qbugbot